Lorraine Daphne Bayly AM (born 16 January 1937) is an Australian actress of film, television and theatre, presenter, singer, dancer, pianist and theatre director and writer. 
 
She is perhaps best known to small screen audiences for her soap opera roles, including numerous Crawford Productions series, but. especially in the World War II period piece drama The Sullivans as matriarch Grace Sullivan, as well as roles in legal drama Carson's Law and serial Neighbours as Faye Hudson  the sister of patriarch Doug Willis played by Terence Donovan.

Early life

Bayly was born in Narrandera, New South Wales. Her first performance was at age 3, playing tambourine with the Salvation Army. At ages 5–9, she wrote, directed and starred in plays in the local jail; her father being a policeman, amateur magician and ventriloquist.
 
At age 9–10, she had her own ventriloquist act which 35 years later she performed on The Parkinson Show in 1983, using host Michael Parkinson as her dummy.

Classical piano

At age 11–12, she played classical piano Saturday afternoons live on Radio 2UE.

Actress

Theatre

Bayly was a founder of the Ensemble Theatre at Kirribilli. She has appeared in professional theatre since 1954, her roles including Chase Me Comrade with Stanley Baxter, playing Linda Loman in Death of a Salesman, Arthur Miller's The Last Yankee, Sheila in John Misto's Shoehorn Sonata, Mrs Patrick Campbell in Dear Liar, Margaret in Rough Justice, D H Lawrence's The Daughter-in-Law, David Williamson's Travelling North and Birthrights, Bella in Gaslight and The Male of The Species with Edward Woodward. In 2010 Bayly starred in the well known play Calendar Girls and more recently in David Williamson's When Dad Married Fury and The Sound of Music

Television

listed among Lorraine Bayly's many television credits: The miniseries 1915 (ABC), The Challenge playing Eileen Bond,  in Grim Pickings (SAFC) as Betsy Tander and as Lindy Chamberlain's mother Avis Murchison in Through My Eyes: The Lindy Chamberlain Story. She was also a popular presenter and original cast member on the children's television show Play School from 1966 to 1978.

Bayly is perhaps best known to television audiences for her portrayal in the drama series The Sullivans (1976–1979), as the motherly Grace Sullivan dealing with life for an ordinary Australian family during the Second World War.

From 1982 to 1984, Bayly played the lead role of in another period television drama Carson's Law as progressive lawyer Jennifer Carson set in 1920s Melbourne. The episodes revolved around the cases taken on by Jennifer and the various personal intrigues of her family. The series also starred Kevin Miles as Jennifer's father-in-law Godfrey Carson and Gregg Caves, as Billy Carson. The series Carson's Law was written specifically for Bayly.

From 1991 to 1992, Bayly appeared in serial  Neighbours as Faye Hudson. Faye was a "busybody" who moved in with her brother Doug Willis (Terence Donovan (actor)|Terence Donovan) and his family.

Film

Lorraine Bayly's film roles include Fatty Finn (AFI nominated), Ride a Wild Pony for Disney and The Man From Snowy River alongside acting legend Kirk Douglas.

Honours and awards (selected)
{|class="wikitable"
| Association
| Award
| Year 
| Work 
| Results
|-bgcolor=cream
| Australian Government
| Member of the Order of Australia
| 2001
| 
| 
|-bgcolor=cream
| Australian Variety
| Variety's 100 Entertainer of the Century
| 2006
| Lifetime honour
| 
|-bgcolor=silver
| Logie Awards
| Silver Logie Award for Most Popular Actress
| 1978
| The Sullivans as Grace Sullivan
| 
|-bgcolor=silver
| Logie Awards
| Silver Logie Award for Most Popular Actress
| 1979
| The Sullivans as Grace Sullivan
| 
|- bgcolor=silver
| Logie Awards
| Silver Logie Award for Most Popular Actress
| 1983
| Carson's Law as Jennifer Carson
| 
|}
She was made a Member of the Order of Australia by The Queen in the Australia Day Honours List 2001.

Bayly has won 10 awards from 14 nominations including three Silver Logies in 1978, 1979 and 1983 for Most Popular Actress in The Sullivans and Carson's Law'' respectively. She was also named in "Australian Variety's 100 Entertainers of the Century" in 2006.

Personal life

Bayly is a staunch advocate for organ donation and a supporter of the Australian Kidney Foundation. She is also a life member of the RSPCA. As of 2019 Lorraine Bayly announced she was to retire from the world of acting and performing in an over 50-year career in film, stage and theatre and will be missed by audiences around the country.

FILM

TELEVISION

Selected theatre
source = AusStage

References

External links
 
 Interview at stevedow.com.au

1937 births
Australian film actresses
Australian stage actresses
Australian television actresses
Members of the Order of Australia
Living people
Australian children's television presenters
Australian women television presenters